Mallos pallidus is a species of mesh web weaver in the spider family Dictynidae. It is found in the United States and Mexico.

References

Dictynidae
Articles created by Qbugbot
Spiders described in 1904